Europetin is an O-methylated flavonol. It can be found in Plumbago europaea and it can be prepared synthetically.

References 

O-methylated flavonols
Pyrogallols